Statistics of Czechoslovak First League in the 1960–61 season.

Overview
It was contested by 14 teams, and Dukla Prague won the championship. Rudolf Kučera and Ladislav Pavlovič were the league's top scorers with 17 goals each.

Stadia and locations

League standings

Dynamo Žilina qualified for the Cup Winners' Cup as Czechoslovak Cup runners-up from a lower division.Spartak Brno KPS invited for the Inter-Cities Fairs Cup from a lower division.

Results

Top goalscorers

References

Czechoslovakia - List of final tables (RSSSF)

Czechoslovak First League seasons
Czech
1960–61 in Czechoslovak football